Mousa Ghaninejad (born 1951 in Tabriz, Iran) is a senior Iranian economist. He has been an honorary visiting professor at the Sharif University of Technology  and is currently a faculty member of Petroleum University of Technology. He was editor-in-chief of daily economic newspaper, Donya-e-Eqtesad.

Contrary to most Iranian intellectuals, Ghaninejad believes in priority of economic reform over political reform.

Education
Ghaninejad got his bachelor's degree in accounting at the University of Tehran, after the Islamic revolution. He then moved to Paris, where he later completed his master and doctorate degree in economics at  Panthéon-Sorbonne University. Afterwards, he continued to another doctorate degree there, Epistemology of economics, but abandoned it just before defending his thesis and moved back to Tehran.

Selected bibliography
He has published books and articles mainly on philosophy, philosophy of economics, epistemology of economics, history of economics ideas and economics and social developments in Iran; the most appraised ones include:
 Modernization and developments in Iran
 Defeat in Freedom-seeking
 Notes on Hayek and civil society 
 Freedom, Economics and Politics.

See also
 Intellectual movements in Iran

References

Living people
1951 births
University of Paris alumni
Academic staff of Sharif University of Technology
University of Tehran alumni
Iranian economists
People from Tabriz
Iranian expatriates in France